John Linebaugh (born ) was an American gunsmith from Cody, Wyoming, known for creating custom firearms. He was the inventor of the .500 Linebaugh (1986) and .475 Linebaugh (1988) cartridges. Gunwriter John Taffin, a big-bore enthusiast, describes Linebaugh as a "pioneer" in developing powerful sixguns.

Biography
Linebaugh's early efforts in the 1970s produced revolvers made to handle much more powerful loadings of .45 Colt than standard firearms, and later expanded into creating his own cartridge designs. After inventing the .500 and .475 Linebaugh, he later created a variant of each cartridge, lengthened to 1.61 inches, and appended "Maximum" to their names. Linebaugh focused on developing cartridges which were compatible with standard-size revolvers, keeping them "old school" or "packable" rather than oversize.

References

"The sixguns of John Linebaugh". American Handgunner; 05/01/2006; Taffin, John

Further reading

External links
 

Ammunition designers
People from Cody, Wyoming
Living people
Year of birth missing (living people)